John Lee Hooker is an eponymous album by blues musician John Lee Hooker recorded in Culver City, California, in 1961 and released by the Galaxy label.  It was later reissued in some territories as The King of Folk Blues.

Track listing
All compositions credited to John Lee Hooker and Bernard Besman
 "Might as Well Say We're Through" – 2:45
 "Risin Sun (Louisiana Voo-Doo)" – 2:54
 "Lost My Job" – 3:01
 "Left My Wife and My Baby" – 2:59
 "Travelin' Day and Night" – 2:56
 "Deep Down in My Heart" – 2:57
 "Shake It Up and Go" – 2:31
 "Fire at Natchez" – 3:08
 "The Sweetest Girl I Know" – 2:59
 "Mad With You Baby" – 2:58
 "My Mother-in-Law Moved In" – 3:09
 "Ballad to Abraham Lincoln" – 3:04

Personnel
John Lee Hooker – guitar, vocals

References

John Lee Hooker albums
1962 albums
Galaxy Records albums